Panch Pokharii is a group of 5 (panch) Hindu holy lakes in the Sindhupalchowk District of Nepal. The lakes are a popular destination for Hindu and Buddhist pilgrims during Janai Purnima.

About
Panch Pokharii is one of the main features of Langtang National Park, located in the Nuwakot, Rasuwa and Sindhulpalchok districts of the central Himalayan region.

The Government of Nepal's Postal Services Department issued a stamp featuring Pokhari in 2011.

Panch Pokhara is situated at an elevation of about 4,100 m above sea level. This is a famous Hindu pilgrimage site in Nepal. Panch Pokhari trekking lies to the north of the Kathmandu valley; the chain of peaks called Jugal Himal that includes Dorje Lhakpa (6,966 m), Madiya (6,257 m) and Phurbi Chhyachu (6,637 m). This is a remote and unfrequented region, despite being close to Kathmandu.

The lakes comprise one of Nepal's many high-altitude wetlands (HAW), but it is not listed as a Ramsar site.

Gallery

References 
3. http://corner.video.blog/2020/05/23/trek-guide-to-panch-pokhari/
Lakes of Bagmati Province